Patrick Joseph O'Dowd (1 March 1892 – 19 June 1968) was an Irish politician and medical practitioner. He was first elected to Dáil Éireann as a Fianna Fáil Teachta Dála (TD) for the Roscommon constituency at the June 1927 general election. He was re-elected at the September 1927 general election but lost his seat at the 1932 general election. He was elected again at the 1933 general election but again lost his seat at the 1937 general election.

Early life and career
O'Dowd was born in 1892 at Graffoge, Roscommon as the second son of James O'Dowd and Honoria (Nora) Shanagher. His parents were both teachers at the local national school where he began his education. He then attended Summerhill College in Sligo. He is said to have been the first registrant of the National University of Ireland, having arrived from the country a day before it was due to open, in order to study medicine at University College Dublin. Upon graduation as a physician, he worked for the Irish Dispensary System, a public health system that had been established in Ireland in the 1850s under the Irish Poor Laws. His first clinic was the dispensary in Elphin, County Roscommon. After the Second World War, he moved to become the doctor at a dispensary in Dublin.

O'Dowd is listed in the 1911 census of Ireland as being a speaker of Irish and English languages. His first wife, Evangela (Eva) Igoe, had strong Irish republican sympathies and was a member of Cumann na mBan. O'Dowd was a medical officer with the Irish Republican Army during the Irish War of Independence. Patrick and Eva O'Dowd would take their annual family holiday in a Gaeltacht in County Kerry in order to maintain the family's ability to speak Irish.

Political life
In the 1920s and 1930s, O'Dowd stood for election and sat in the 5th Dáil, 6th Dáil and 8th Dáil. In 1937, he resigned from the Fianna Fáil political party over a disagreement with its leader Éamon de Valera. He stood as an independent at the 1937 general election but lost his seat. O'Dowd spoke frequently in the Dáil, mainly on issues of public health, Roscommon land allocation, and affairs of his constituents. 

In 1927, he supported William Redmond who proposed to the Government that a commission be established to investigate and report on the circumstances of the British ex-Servicemen in the Irish Free State because of concerns regarding "alleged discrimination against them in regard to employment on public works or in regard to their general rights".

O'Dowd played contract bridge representing Ireland on several occasions at the "Home Internationals" in the 1940s and 1950s. Eva O'Dowd died of breast cancer in 1947. O'Dowd married Kathleen Donohue of Cavan in 1950. He died of a heart attack in 1968.

References

1892 births
1968 deaths
Fianna Fáil TDs
Members of the 5th Dáil
Members of the 6th Dáil
Members of the 8th Dáil
Politicians from County Roscommon